Mohammed Asab (born 10 September 1987) is an Indian shooter who competes in the double trap event. In the same event, he won the bronze medal at the 2014 Commonwealth Games in Glasgow, Scotland.and missed his 2nd commonwealth medal at the 2018 Commonwealth Games in Gold Coast, Australia, where he secure 4th rank. 
medals.

He also participated at the ISSF World Shooting Championships,  Commonwealth Shooting Championships,  World Cup,     Asian Championship and won medals. He hold a world record at the ISSF World Cup in Acapulco, Mexico.

He is one of the best shooter of India, who have nine times national champion on double trap event.

Early life
His early life was spent in Amroli (Bada Gaon), a small village in Meerut, India. Asab is belong to the shooter's family, 
His elder brother is a coach in the Indian Army and one brother plays on behalf of the Indian Air Force.

Awards and recognitions
 2016- Laxman award (Highest Sporting Honour of Uttar Pradesh).
 2016- Nominee of Arjuna Award (Highest Sporting Honour of India).

External links
 Mohammed Asab profile at ISSF

Living people
1987 births
Indian male sport shooters
Sport shooters from Uttar Pradesh
Shooters at the 2014 Commonwealth Games
Commonwealth Games bronze medallists for India
Shooters at the 2014 Asian Games
Commonwealth Games medallists in shooting
Asian Games competitors for India
Sportspeople from Meerut
Medallists at the 2014 Commonwealth Games